Cyrtochloa is a genus of Philippine bamboo in the grass family.

Species

References

External links

Bambusoideae
Bambusoideae genera
Endemic flora of the Philippines